Nothing Shall Be Hidden is a 1912 American silent drama film. It was produced by the Independent Moving Pictures (IMP) Company of New York and is the earliest-known directorial effort of Harry A. Pollard, who also costars in the production with Margarita Fischer.

External links
 

1912 films
Silent American drama films
American silent short films
American black-and-white films
1912 short films
1912 drama films
1910s American films